Linda Carbonetto, married names: Engel, Villella (born April 12, 1949) is a Canadian former competitive figure skater. She is the 1969 Canadian national champion and competed at the 1968 Winter Olympics. She was born in New York City and raised in Ontario.

Carbonetto turned professional in 1970 and toured professionally with Ice Capades. She serves as the School Director for the Miami City Ballet. Her second husband is Edward Villella.  She was also married to Peter Engel for a time.

Competitive highlights

References

 
 

1949 births
Canadian female single skaters
Figure skaters at the 1968 Winter Olympics
Olympic figure skaters of Canada
Living people
Sportspeople from New York City